Voting to elect six members of the Lebanese parliament took place in the North I district (one of three electoral districts in the north Lebanon region) on 6 May 2018, part of the general election of that year. The constituency had 137,550 who voted. The district elects 3 Sunni, 2 Greek Orthodox, 1 Maronite, 1 Alawite. It covers the Akkar district.

Demographics 
The electorate is predominantly Sunni (67.5%). 14.7% of the electorate is Greek Orthodox, 10.9% Maronite, 4.97% Alawite, 1.05% Shia, 0.62% Greek Catholic and 0.29% from other Christian communities.

Voting 
In Akkar 6 lists were registered. The Future Movement opted for a list of its own (with Lebanese Forces candidate Qatisha as candidate for a Greek Orthodox seat). There is also a list supported by March 8 coalition "The Decision for Akkar" (headed by ex-MP Wajih Barini, in alliance with the Marada Movement and the Arab Democratic Party), the "Decision of Akkar" list, the "Strong Akkar" list (Free Patriotic Movement, al-Jamaa al-Islamiah, pro-Future independents), "Sovereign Lebanon" list (led by Ashraf Rifi) and the "Women of Akkar" list.

Candidates

References 

2018 Lebanese general election